was a town located in Hakui District, Ishikawa Prefecture, Japan.

As of 2003, the town had an estimated population of 8,985 and a density of 72.77 persons per km². The total area was 123.48 km².

On September 1, 2005, Togi was merged into the expanded town of Shika.

Dissolved municipalities of Ishikawa Prefecture
Shika, Ishikawa